Shimoda may refer to:

Places in Japan
Shimoda, Shizuoka, a city in Shizuoka Prefecture
Shimoda Ropeway, an aerial tramway which climbs Mount Nesugata
Shimoda, Aomori, a town in Aomori Prefecture
Shimoda Station, a railway station in Oirase, Aomori Prefecture

Other uses
Shimoda (surname), a Japanese surname
Siege of Shimoda (1590), in Shimoda, Shizuoka
Shimoda bugyō, 19th-century Japanese title equivalent to commissioner, overseer or governor
Shimoda Conference, series of unofficial dialogues between the United States and Japan
Treaty of Shimoda (1855), between Japan and Russia

See also
Ryuichi Shimoda v. The State, a court case by a group of five survivors of the atomic attacks on Hiroshima and Nagasaki
The Judith of Shimoda, a play attributed to Bertold Brecht